is Ken Hirai's twenty-ninth (second recut) single, released on April 23, 2008. The song was written for the movie "Ano Sora wo Oboeteru", starring Yutaka Takenouchi. The music video stars actress Rie Miyazawa.

Track list

Charts

Oricon Sales Chart

Billboard Japan Sales Chart

Physical Sales Charts

References

2008 songs
2008 singles
Ken Hirai songs
Songs written by Ken Hirai
Japanese film songs
Defstar Records singles